The 2015–16 San Jose State Spartans men's basketball team represented San Jose State University during the 2015–16 NCAA Division I men's basketball season. The Spartans, led by third year head coach Dave Wojcik, played their home games at the Event Center Arena and were members of the Mountain West Conference. They finished the season 9–22, 4–14 in Mountain West play to finish in last place. They lost in the first round of the Mountain West tournament to Colorado State.

Previous season
The Spartans finished the season 2–28, 0–18 in Mountain West play to finish in last place. During the season, the Spartans were invited and participated in the Wooden Legacy in Anaheim, California. They earned last place from not defeating any team they were against in the tournament. They failed to defeat a Division I opponent. Due to APR penalties, San Jose State was ineligible for postseason tournament play, including the Mountain West tournament.

Departures

Incoming transfers

Recruits

Roster

Schedule

|-
!colspan=9 style="background:#005a8b; color:#c79900;"| Exhibition

|-
!colspan=9 style="background:#005a8b; color:#c79900;"| Non-conference regular season

|-
!colspan=9 style="background:#005a8b; color:#c79900;"| Mountain West regular season

|-
!colspan=9 style="background:#005a8b; color:#c79900;"| Mountain West tournament

References

San Jose State Spartans men's basketball seasons
San Jose State
San Jose State Spartans men's basketball
San Jose State Spartans men's basketball